Lohani cattle (also known as acchai cattle) are a breed of cattle named after the Loralai district of Balochistan, though it is found throughout Pakistan and India. They belong to the zebu breed of cattle, which are typically found in the hilly areas of India and Pakistan. They were originally a working breed, but are now used for milking as well.

Characteristics 
They are draft type of cattle and are smaller than many other types of cattle, with the average bull weighing 300–350 kg. Their coat is normally red with white spots. The cattle have a narrow face, small ears and big, eyes. The forehead is slightly concave and often has white markings. The horns usually are long and vertical. They typically measure from between 12 and 18 inches in length. The horns are also usually short and thick.

Origin 
It is believed that the Lohani originated from Lorali in Pakistan. The cattle are adapted to survive here as they are short and have relatively long legs to cross the uneven hills, which are typically between 3000 and 10,000 feet tall. Today, many cattle are found in the North West Frontier Province of Pakistan where they are called acchai cattle.

References

Cattle breeds originating in India 
Cattle breeds originating in Pakistan